The Moroccan Royal Volleyball Federation (FRMVB), is the governing body for Volleyball in Morocco since 1955.

History
The Moroccan Royal Federation has been recognised by FIVB from 1955 and is a member of the African Volleyball Confederation.
The FRMVB organize all volleyball activities in morocco for both men and women as well as beach volleyball for both gender.

See also
Morocco men's national volleyball team
Morocco women's national volleyball team
Morocco men's national under-23 volleyball team
Morocco men's national under-21 volleyball team
Morocco men's national under-19 volleyball team
Morocco women's national under-23 volleyball team
Morocco women's national under-20 volleyball team
Morocco women's national under-18 volleyball team

References

External links 
 FRMVB official site

Volleyball in Morocco
Volleyball
Sports organizations established in 1955
National members of the African Volleyball Confederation
1955 establishments in Morocco